Kim Min-Goo may refer to:
 Kim Min-goo (basketball) (born 1991), South Korean basketball player
 Kim Min-goo (footballer) (born 1985), South Korean football player